Negar Bouban (Persian: نگار بوبان, also transliterated as Negâr Boubân or Negar Buban) (born Tehran, Iran, 1973) is an Iranian oud and barbat player and student of Mansour Nariman, best known for playing Iranian folk music and improvisational works.

Negar Bouban was a Fellow at Music OMI international residency 2012 in New York City and has also worked as a music teacher, music historian and author. She is an assistant professor in the music department of the Islamic Azad University, Shiraz branch.

Life
Bouban was born in Kurdistan and grew up in Tehran. At the age of eight, she played the santur, but later took up the oud. She spent her high school years at Farzanegan High School in Tehran and graduated from the University of Tehran with a degree in architecture. While studying architecture at the university, she became interested in the subject of acoustics and chose the design of acoustic halls for rehearsing and performing Iranian music and compiling a plan for the Tehran Conservatory of Music as the subject of her master's thesis. In 2009, Boban received a doctorate in art research from Al-Zahra University. Her doctoral dissertation entitled "The Common Foundation of Rhythm in Iranian Instrumental Music and Persian Language" (supervised by Omid Tabibzadeh and advised by Hossein Alizadeh and Zahra Rahbarnia) is about the relationship between weight in official Persian language and traditional music.

Discography
 On Fire (2018)
 A Tale, Foretold (2016)
 Through (2012)
 Dar Gozar (2012)
 In Turn (2011)
 When There is More Beauty in the Contrary (2011)
 Be Hangam (2011)
 Fever (2011)
 Showqname (2010)
 Sarkhâne (2010)
 Continu (2008)
 Payaapey (2008)
 Charm of Tombak (2008)
 Az khiyal-e kopachinha-ye Alborz (2004)
 Shivang (2003)
 Goshayesh (2002)

References

External links

Iranian oud players
1973 births
Living people
Iranian women musicians